East Kootenay was a provincial electoral district in use in British Columbia from 1890 to 1898.  That riding's  predecessor (and that of its onetime sibling, West Kootenay) was the original Kootenay riding, and its successors were East Kootenay South and East Kootenay North.

Electoral History 1890-94 

East Kootenay existed as a riding name in the 1890 and 1894 general elections.  Results for that riding are as follows:

|-

|Government
|James Baker
|align="right"|250
|align="right"|60.10%
|align="right"|
|align="right"|unknown

|Opposition
|Nicolai Christian Schou
|align="right"|166
|align="right"|39.90%
|align="right"|
|align="right"|unknown
|- bgcolor="white"
!align="right" colspan=3|Total valid votes
!align="right"|416
!align="right"|100.00%
!align="right"|
|- bgcolor="white"
!align="right" colspan=3|Total rejected ballots
!align="right"|
!align="right"|
!align="right"|
|- bgcolor="white"
!align="right" colspan=3|Turnout
!align="right"|%
!align="right"|
!align="right"|

|-

|Government
|James Baker
|align="right"|145
|align="right"|50.70%
|align="right"|
|align="right"|unknown

|Opposition
|Charles Law
|align="right"|141
|align="right"|49.30%
|align="right"|
|align="right"|unknown
|- bgcolor="white"
!align="right" colspan=3|Total valid votes
!align="right"|286
!align="right"|100.00%
!align="right"|
|- bgcolor="white"
!align="right" colspan=3|Total rejected ballots
!align="right"|
!align="right"|
!align="right"|
|- bgcolor="white"
!align="right" colspan=3|Turnout
!align="right"|%
!align="right"|
!align="right"|

External links 
Elections British Columbia historical returns

Former provincial electoral districts of British Columbia